Bastoni is an Italian surname. Notable people with the surname include:

Alessandro Bastoni (born 1999), Italian footballer
Guglielmo Bastoni (1544–1609), Italian Roman Catholic Bishop of Pavia and Apostolic Nuncio to Naples
Pietro Bastoni (1570–1622), Italian Roman Catholic bishop
Raffaele Bastoni (1925–1992), Italian sprint canoeist
Simone Bastoni (born 1996), Italian football player
Steve Bastoni (born 1966), Australian actor

Italian-language surnames